Jean-Claude Garde (born 12 September 1960) is a French former professional racing cyclist. He rode in the 1986 Tour de France and the 1985 Vuelta a España.

References

External links
 

1960 births
Living people
People from Condrieu
French male cyclists
Sportspeople from Rhône (department)
Cyclists from Auvergne-Rhône-Alpes